Ian Cheshire (12 April 1936 – 28 November 2013) was a Scottish petroleum engineer who developed the ECLIPSE reservoir simulator.

Biography
He had worked for Schlumberger where he was a Schlumberger Fellow from 1999 to 2003.

He was awarded the Anthony F. Lucas Gold Medal by the Society of Petroleum Engineers in 2001. He was also awarded the Queen's Award for Technology in 1985.

References

External links
 IOR Views "Seminar and Dinner Mark Retirement of Professor John Fayers", 9 November 2004

Petroleum engineers
Living people
1936 births
Scottish engineers